Rolf Björklund (born 2 October 1938) is a Swedish former footballer who played his entire career at Malmö FF as a defender.

References

External links

1938 births
Association football defenders
Swedish footballers
Allsvenskan players
Malmö FF players
Living people
Sweden international footballers